Luke Campbell may refer to:
     
 Uncle Luke (born 1960), aka Luke, rapper and 2011 Miami, Florida mayoral candidate
 Luke Campbell (boxer) (born 1987), English professional boxer
 Luke Campbell (director), British director, producer and writer
 Luke Campbell, character in Heroes
 Luke Campbell (volleyball) (born 1979), Australian Volleyball player
 Luke Campbell (hurdler) (born 1994), German-American hurdler
 Luke Campbell (rugby union, born 1992), Canadian rugby union player
 Luke Campbell (rugby union, born 1995), New Zealand rugby union player